Lloyd Jackson Stovall (August 20, 1911	– October 16, 1983) was an American football coach.  He was the third head football coach at Southeastern Louisiana College—now known as Southeastern Louisiana University—in Hammond, Louisiana and he held that position for three seasons, from 1938 until 1940.  His coaching record at Southeastern Louisiana was 14–13–3.  Stovall had previously coached football at Pearl River College.  He played college football at Louisiana State University (LSU).

Head coaching record

College

References

External links
 

1911 births
1983 deaths
American football centers
LSU Tigers football players
Southeastern Louisiana Lions football coaches
Junior college football coaches in the United States
People from Dodson, Louisiana
Players of American football from Louisiana